Andrew Eime (born 3 July 1971) is an Australian cricketer. He played four first-class and five List A matches for South Australia between 1996 and 1999.

See also
 List of South Australian representative cricketers

References

External links
 

1971 births
Living people
Australian cricketers
South Australia cricketers
Cricketers from Adelaide